Events in the year 1880 in India.

Incumbents
 Empress of India – Queen Victoria
 Viceroy of India – Robert Bulwer-Lytton, 1st Earl of Lytton
 Viceroy of India – George Robinson, 1st Marquess of Ripon (from 8 June)

Events
 National income - 4,025 million
 18 September – 151 people were buried in a landslip at Naini Tal following  of rain in 68 hours.

Law
Religious Societies Act
Kazis Act
East India Loan (East Indian Railway Debentures) Act (British statute)
India Stock (Powers of Attorney) Act (British statute)

Births
 16 March – Rajshekhar Basu, writer, chemist and lexicographer (died 27 April 1960).
 31 July – Munshi Premchand, foremost Writer in Hindu-Urdu Literature and Indian Freedom fighter (died 8 October 1936).
 Abul Muhasin Muhammad Sajjad, scholar, freedom fighter and founder of Muslim Independent Party (died 1940).

References

 
India
Years of the 19th century in India